Daniel Isaac Vernon Eaton (September 19, 1869 – April 11, 1917) was a Canadian surveyor, civil engineer, geologist and military officer.
He served as Albert Peter Low's assistant, during a long expedition to explore Labrador, from 1894 to 1896.

He served as an officer during World War I, and died during the Battle of Vimy Ridge.

Military career

Eaton joined the military reserves in 1887, when he was 18.  He worked as a surveyor, geologist and explorer, until he joined the regular army in 1896.  Eaton spent most of his military career as an artillery officer.

He served two hitches in the South Africa.  Where he attracted the attention of senior officers.  He served on a special mission under Robert Stephenson Smyth Baden-Powell.

In 1902 he was the "first colonial officer to attend the Staff College at Camberley, England."

He started World War I as a Battery Commander, and was promoted to command a Brigade.

References

1869 births
1917 deaths
Canadian surveyors
People from Truro, Nova Scotia
Canadian civil engineers
Canadian military personnel killed in World War I
Canadian Expeditionary Force officers